Elections to Bury Council took place on 5 May 2011.  One third of the council was up for election, and the Labour Party took overall control of the council.

17 seats were contested. The Labour Party won 13 seats, and the Conservatives won 4 seats.

After the election, the total composition of the council was as follows:
Labour 29
Conservative 17
Liberal Democrats 5

Election result

Ward results

References

2011 English local elections
2011
2010s in Greater Manchester